This is a list giving breakdowns of the members serving in the European Parliament session from 2009 to 2014, following the 2009 election. For a full single list, see: List of members of the European Parliament 2009–2014.

MEPs
MEPs for Austria 2009–2014
MEPs for Belgium 2009–2014
MEPs for Bulgaria 2009–2014
MEPs for Croatia 2013–2014
MEPs for Cyprus 2009–2014
MEPs for the Czech Republic 2009–2014
MEPs for Denmark 2009–2014
MEPs for Estonia 2009–2014
MEPs for Finland 2009–2014
MEPs for France 2009–2014
MEPs for Germany 2009–2014
MEPs for Greece 2009–2014
MEPs for Hungary 2009–2014
MEPs for Ireland 2009–2014
MEPs for Italy 2009–2014
MEPs for Latvia 2009–2014
MEPs for Lithuania 2009–2014
MEPs for Luxembourg 2009–2014
MEPs for Malta 2009–2014
List of members of the European Parliament for the Netherlands, 2009–2014
MEPs for Poland 2009–2014
MEPs for Portugal 2009–2014
MEPs for Romania 2009–2014
MEPs for Slovakia 2009–2014
MEPs for Slovenia 2009–2014
MEPs for Spain 2009–2014
MEPs for Sweden 2009–2014
MEPs for the United Kingdom 2009–2014

Observers
Observers for Croatia 2012–2013